Mahmood Ayazwas Vice Chancellor of king Edward Medical University, Lahore and ex-principal of Services Institute of Medical Sciences and patron of Services Hospital since 1 August 2017. He was awarded an honorary fellowship by the American College of Surgeons in November 2013.

References 

Pakistani surgeons
Academic staff of the Services Institute of Medical Sciences
People from Lahore
Living people
Year of birth missing (living people)